Friedrich Hermann Otto of Hohenzollern-Hechingen (born 22 July 1776 in Namur; died 13 September 1838 at Schloss Lindich in Hechingen) was the penultimate Prince of Hohenzollern-Hechingen. Friedrich was the only child of Hermann, Prince of Hohenzollern-Hechingen (1751–1810) and his wife Princess Maximiliane of Gavre (1753 or 1755 – 1778). From 1806 to 1812, he fought on the French side in the Napoleonic Wars and was severely wounded in the 1812 Russian campaign.

Marriage and issue
Friedrich married Princess Pauline Biron von Kurland, Princess of Sagan (1782–1845) in Prague on 26 April 1800. Friedrich and Luise had one child:

 Constantine, Prince of Hohenzollern-Hechingen (16 February 1801 – 3 September 1869)
 ∞ Eugénie de Beauharnais, no issue.
 ∞ Baroness Amalie Schenk von Geyern, issue.

1776 births
1838 deaths
House of Hohenzollern-Hechingen
Princes of Hohenzollern-Hechingen
People from Namur (city)
German military personnel of the Napoleonic Wars
People educated at the Karlsschule Stuttgart